Michèle Brigitte Roberts FRSL (born 20 May 1949) is a British writer, novelist and poet. She is the daughter of a French Catholic teacher mother (Monique Caulle) and English Protestant father (Reginald Roberts), and has dual UK–France nationality.

Early life
Roberts was born to a French Catholic mother and English Protestant father in Bushey, Hertfordshire, but raised in Edgware, Middlesex. She was educated at a convent, expecting to become a nun, before reading English at Somerville College, Oxford, where she lost her Catholic faith. She also studied at University College London, training to be a librarian. She worked for the British Council in Bangkok, Thailand, in this role from 1973 to 1974.

Career
Active in socialist and feminist politics (the Women's Liberation Movement) since the early 1970s, she formed a writers' collective with Sara Maitland, Michelene Wandor and Zoe Fairbairns. At this time Roberts was the Poetry Editor (1975–77) at Spare Rib, the feminist magazine, and later at City Limits (1981–83). Her first novel, A Piece of the Night, was published in 1978. Her 1992 novel Daughters of the House was shortlisted for the Booker Prize, and won the 1993 WH Smith Literary Award.

Paper Houses, a memoir of her life since 1970, was published in 2007: "Drawing on her diaries of the period, she brings back a more political, though also hedonistic era of radical feminism, communes and demonstrations. And the friendships she made and has kept ever since, notably with fellow feminist writers such as Sara Maitland, Micheline Wandor and Alison Fell. Roberts also self-analyzes the effects of her Anglo-French family’s Catholicism ('the nun in my head, that monstrous Mother Superior'), which have remained a fertile source, even as she reacted against its overt doctrines. Her exploration of London, the various areas and houses that she lived in, went alongside her development as a writer. For her, writing 'meant voyaging into the unknown and having adventures' though also 'bearing witness to other people’s stories as well as my own'."

In her 2020 work, Negative Capability: A Diary of Surviving, Roberts documents a period of crisis following the rejection of a novel she was writing by her publisher and agent. The title is taken from a quotation by Keats.

Roberts is an Emeritus Professor of Creative Writing at the University of East Anglia and was Visiting Professor in Writing at Nottingham Trent University for several years.

Honours and recognition 

Roberts was elected as a Fellow of the Royal Society of Literature in 1999.
She is a Chevalier de l'Ordre des Arts et des Lettres, awarded by the French government, but turned down an OBE as a consequence of her republican views.

Publications

Essays
Food, Sex & God: on Inspiration and Writing, 1988, Virago Press

Novels
A Piece of the Night, 1978, Women's Press
The Visitation, 1978, Women's Press
The Wild Girl (also known as The Secret Gospel of Mary Magdalene), 1984, Methuen
The Book of Mrs Noah, 1987, Methuen
In the Red Kitchen, 1990, Methuen
Daughters of the House, 1992, Virago and Morrow (USA)
During Mother's Absence, 1992, Virago
Flesh & Blood, 1994, Virago
Impossible Saints, 1998, Ecco Press
Fair Exchange, 1999, Little, Brown
The Looking Glass, 2000, Little, Brown
The Mistressclass, 2002, Little, Brown
Reader, I Married Him, 2006, Little, Brown
Ignorance, 2012, Bloomsbury Publishing
The Walworth Beauty, 2017, Bloomsbury
Cut Out, 2021, Sandstone Press,

Poetry
Touch Papers: Three Women Poets (with Michelene Wandor and Judith Kazantzis), 1982, Allison and Busby
The Mirror of the Mother, 1986, Methuen
Psyche and the Hurricane , 1991, Methuen
All the Selves I Was, 1995, Virago

Short stories
Your Shoes, 1991
During Mother's Absence, 1993, Virago
Playing Sardines, 2001, Virago
Mud: Stories of Sex and Love, 2010, Virago

Memoir
Paper Houses: A Memoir of the 70s and Beyond, 2007, Virago, ; paperback 2008, 
Negative Capability: A Diary of Surviving, 2020, Sandstone Press,

Bibliography
 Maria Soraya García-Sánchez: Travelling in Women's History with Michèle Roberts's Novels: Literature, Language and Culture. Bern: Lang, 2011, 
 Susanne Gruss: The Pleasure of the Feminist Text: Reading Michèle Roberts and Angela Carter. Amsterdam: Rodopi, 2009, 
 Nick Rennison: Contemporary British Novelists. London: Routledge, Taylor & Francis, 2005, p. 137–140.

References

External links
 
 "Take risks", The Guardian, 14 July 2007 – interview-based feature by Lucasta Miller
 

1949 births
20th-century English women writers
20th-century English writers
21st-century English women writers
Academics of Nottingham Trent University
Academics of the University of East Anglia
Alumni of Somerville College, Oxford
Alumni of University College London
British feminist writers
British journalists
British republicans
British women academics
British women short story writers
English people of French descent
English women novelists
Fellows of the Royal Society of Literature
Former Roman Catholics
Living people
People from Bushey
People from Edgware